Viktorija Nedeva (born 20 June 2003) is a Macedonian footballer who plays as a defender for the North Macedonia national team.

International career
Nedeva made her debut for the North Macedonia national team on 25 November 2021, against Northern Ireland.

References

2003 births
Living people
Women's association football defenders
Macedonian women's footballers
North Macedonia women's international footballers